Pokémon: Advanced is the sixth season of Pokémon and the first season of Pokémon the Series: Ruby and Sapphire, known in Japan as . It originally aired in Japan from November 21, 2002, to August 28, 2003, on TV Tokyo, and in the United States from November 1, 2003, to September 4, 2004, on Kids' WB/The WB. It aired in India from May 9, 2006, on Cartoon Network.

Set in the fictional Hoenn region, the season follows the adventures of the ten-year-old Pokémon trainer Ash Ketchum, and his electric mouse partner Pikachu as they collect Gym Badges so they can compete in the Hoenn League competition. Along the way, they are joined by Brock, the leader of the Pewter City Gym, and the Pokémon coordinator May and her brother, Max, as May competes in Pokémon Contests with the aim of earning Ribbons so she can enter the Hoenn Grand Festival.

The episodes were directed by Masamitsu Hidaka and produced by the animation studio OLM.



Episode list

Music 
The Japanese opening song is "Advance Adventure" (アドバンスアドベンチャー, Adobansu Adobenchā) by GARDEN for 40 episodes. The ending songs are "Because the Sky is There" (そこに空があるから, Soko ni Sora ga Aru Kara) by Toshiko Ezaki for 18 episodes, and "Polka O Dolka" (ポルカ・ドルカ, Poruka O Doruka) by Inuko Inuyama (Meowth) and Nolsol Chorus Group for 22 episodes, and the English opening song is "I Wanna Be a Hero" by David Rolfe. A shortened version of the English opening song was used for the end credits.

Critical reception 
Themanime.org gave a positive review saying that "the anime does stuff from the video games in this season" and that "May isn't just a replacement of Misty" Movie Reviews Simbasible gave a negative review saying that "the new characters are actually more annoying instead of likeable" and that "it ended up being a bore but with some very good episodes"Alfah, writing for Pokeblog gave a positive review, giving the season a 8/10 and saying that  "It's an awesome start to the Advanced Generation series, showing growth of two protagonists, Ash and May. Other than Max's bratty attitude, this is an awesome season: a definite must-watch."

Home media
In the United States, Viz Video and Ventura Distribution released the series on 8 VHS and DVD volumes from 2004-2005. The entire series was released on DVD, while the VHS versions only featured the first three episodes from each release.

Viz Media later released two 3-disc boxed DVD sets in 2005 and 2006, containing 6-7 episodes per disc.

Viz Media and Warner Home Video released Pokémon: Advanced – The Complete Collection on DVD in the United States on May 16, 2017.

Notes

References

External links 
 
  at TV Tokyo 
  at TV Tokyo 
  at Pokémon JP official website 

2002 Japanese television seasons
2003 Japanese television seasons
Season06
ja:ポケットモンスター アドバンスジェネレーション